The canton of Le Portel is a former canton situated in the department of the Pas-de-Calais and in the Nord-Pas-de-Calais region of northern France. It was disbanded following the French canton reorganisation which came into effect in March 2015. It consisted of 2 communes, which joined the canton of Boulogne-sur-Mer-2 in 2015. It had a total of 18,640 inhabitants (2012).

Geography 
The canton is organised around Le Portel in the arrondissement of Boulogne-sur-Mer. The altitude varies from 0m to 110m at Boulogne-sur-Mer for an average altitude of 12m.

The canton comprised 2 communes:
Boulogne-sur-Mer (partly)
Le Portel

See also 
Cantons of Pas-de-Calais 
Communes of Pas-de-Calais 
Arrondissements of the Pas-de-Calais department

References

Former cantons of Pas-de-Calais
2015 disestablishments in France
States and territories disestablished in 2015